Francisco José 'Fran' Cortés Vázquez (born 4 February 1986 in Cádiz, Andalusia) is a Spanish footballer who plays as a midfielder.

External links

Stats and bio at Cadistas1910 

1986 births
Living people
Footballers from Cádiz
Spanish footballers
Association football midfielders
Segunda División players
Segunda División B players
Tercera División players
Cádiz CF B players
Cádiz CF players
Polideportivo Ejido footballers
Huracán Valencia CF players